Jack McMillan, may refer to:

 Jack McMillan (Australian footballer) (1912–1969), Australian rules football player
 Jack McMillan (Scottish footballer) (born 1997), Scottish footballer
 Jack McMillan (swimmer)